Juan Augusto Gómez Olmos (born 24 May 1976 in Tucumán) is a former Argentina-born, naturalized-Mexican footballer.

References
 
 

Argentine footballers
Association football midfielders
C.D. Veracruz footballers
Tigres UANL footballers
Indios de Ciudad Juárez footballers
Liga MX players
1976 births
Argentine emigrants to Mexico
Living people
Sportspeople from San Miguel de Tucumán
Correcaminos UAT footballers